Floyd Melvin ("Mel") Hammond (born December 19, 1933) was an Idaho politician and has been a general authority of the Church of Jesus Christ of Latter-day Saints (LDS Church) since 1989. He was the nineteenth general president of the church's Young Men organization from 2001 to 2004.

Hammond was born in Blackfoot, Idaho. He served as an LDS Church missionary in the Spanish–American Mission from 1954 to 1956. Hammond attended Ricks College and Brigham Young University (BYU). After graduating from BYU, Hammond became a professor of religion at Ricks College in 1966. He was a member of the Idaho House of Representatives from 1969 to 1984 and served as House Minority Leader for three terms.

Before his call as a general authority, Hammond served in the LDS Church as a bishop, stake president, and regional representative.  In 1984, Hammond became president of the church's Bolivia Cochabamba Mission.  In 1989, he became a member of the Second Quorum of the Seventy. In 1993, he was transferred to the First Quorum of the Seventy, where he served until being designated as an emeritus general authority in 2005.

From 1997 to 1998, Hammond was second counselor to Jack H. Goaslind in the Young Men General Presidency. From 1998 to 2001, he served as first counselor to general president Robert K. Dellenbach. In 2001, Hammond succeeded Dellenbach as the organization's general president. Hammond served until 2004, when he was succeeded by Charles W. Dahlquist II. Hammond was the last general authority of the church to serve as the Young Men General President.  From 2005 to 2008, Hammond served as president of the Washington D.C. Temple.

In 2003, Hammond was awarded the Silver Buffalo Award by the Boy Scouts of America for his work to incorporate Scouting into the LDS Church's Young Men program.

Hammond is married to Bonnie Sellers and they are the parents of six children.

References

“Elder F. Melvin Hammond of the Second Quorum of the Seventy,” Ensign, May 1989, p. 95

External links
F. Melvin Hammond Official profile

1933 births
American general authorities (LDS Church)
American Mormon missionaries in the United States
Brigham Young University alumni
Brigham Young University–Idaho faculty
General Presidents of the Young Men (organization)
Living people
Members of the Idaho House of Representatives
Members of the First Quorum of the Seventy (LDS Church)
Members of the Second Quorum of the Seventy (LDS Church)
Mission presidents (LDS Church)
American Mormon missionaries in Bolivia
Regional representatives of the Twelve
Temple presidents and matrons (LDS Church)
20th-century Mormon missionaries
Counselors in the General Presidency of the Young Men (organization)
Religious leaders from Idaho
Latter Day Saints from Idaho